Lycée Denis Diderot may refer to:
Lycée Denis Diderot (Kenya) - Nairobi, Kenya
Lycée Denis Diderot (Carvin) - Carvin, France